The Game at Radio City was played on August 5, 2004, at Radio City Music Hall in New York, New York. This game is not considered a standard All-Star Game.

In order to allow players to participate in the 2004 Summer Olympics, the WNBA took a month-long break. However, prior to the teams heading to Athens, the WNBA hosted an exhibition game between the U.S. Olympic Team and a team of WNBA stars.  Every player on the Olympic team was also an WNBA player.  The WNBA squad consisted of American players, with the exception of Mwadi Mabika who was from the Democratic Republic of the Congo. (Her country's women's basketball team did not qualify for the Olympics that year.)

The Game

Rosters

1 Injured
2 Injury replacement
3 Injured at time of game, but no replacement selected

Coaches
The coach for the USA Olympic Team was Houston Comets coach Van Chancellor. The coach for the WNBA Team was Detroit Shock coach Bill Laimbeer.

References

WNBA All-star Game, 2004
Women's National Basketball Association All-Star Game
Radio City Music Hall
2004 in sports in New York City
2004 in New York City
Basketball competitions in New York City